The Communauté d'agglomération du Pays Voironnais is the communauté d'agglomération, an intercommunal structure, centred on the town of Voiron. It is located in the Isère department, in the Auvergne-Rhône-Alpes region, eastern France. It was created in 2000. Its area is 367.3 km2. Its population was 93,573 in 2018, of which 20,248 in Voiron proper.

Composition
The communauté d'agglomération consists of the following 31 communes:

Bilieu 
La Buisse
Charancieu
Charavines 
Charnècles
Chirens 
Coublevie
Massieu 
Merlas 
Moirans 
Montferrat
La Murette 
Réaumont
Rives
Saint-Aupre 
Saint-Blaise-du-Buis 
Saint-Bueil 
Saint-Cassien 
Saint-Étienne-de-Crossey 
Saint-Geoire-en-Valdaine 
Saint-Jean-de-Moirans 
Saint-Nicolas-de-Macherin 
Saint-Sulpice-des-Rivoires 
La Sure en Chartreuse 
Tullins 
Velanne 
Villages du Lac de Paladru 
Voiron 
Voissant 
Voreppe 
Vourey

References

Voiron
Voiron